Augusta Lake may refer to:

Augusta Lake (Cottonwood County, Minnesota), a lake in the southwestern portion of the state
Augusta Lake (Dakota County, Minnesota), a lake near Minneapolis-St. Paul
Lake Augusta (Western Australia)
Lake Augusta (Washington), a lake in the Alpine Lakes Wilderness